Padus can refer to:
Po (river) ("Padus" in ancient Latin)
Prunus subg. Padus, a subgenus of the plant genus Prunus
Padus, Wisconsin
Padus Vallis, a geographical feature (valley) on the planet Mars
Padus, Inc., developer of DiscJuggler

See also
Padania, alternative name for Po Valley, Italy